Dunwell is a surname. Notable people with the surname include:

Brad Dunwell, American soccer player
Charles T. Dunwell (1852–1908), American politician
Mary Ann Dunwell, American politician
Michael Dunwell, English soccer player and manager
Richard Dunwell, English soccer player
Steve Dunwell, American photographer